Michael Aloysius Devaney (June 6, 1891 – January 25, 1967) was an American track and field athlete who competed in the 1920 Summer Olympics and in the 1924 Summer Olympics. He was born and died in Belleville, New Jersey.

In 1920 he finished fifth in the 3000 metre steeplechase competition. He was also a member of the American team which won the gold medal in the 3000 metre team race. Four years later he finished seventh in the 3000 metre steeplechase event.

References

External links

1891 births
1967 deaths
People from Belleville, New Jersey
Sportspeople from Essex County, New Jersey
Track and field athletes from New Jersey
American male middle-distance runners
American male steeplechase runners
Olympic track and field athletes of the United States
Athletes (track and field) at the 1920 Summer Olympics
Athletes (track and field) at the 1924 Summer Olympics